The 1897 Victorian Football Association season was the 21st season of the Australian rules football competition. The premiership was won by the Port Melbourne Football Club, the first premiership in its history.

The 1897 season the VFA's first season as the second-tier senior football competition in Victoria. From 1877 until 1896, the VFA had been the top senior competition in the colony, but at the end of 1896, eight of the association's strongest clubs broke away, establishing the rival Victorian Football League, which immediately assumed the position as the highest level of competition.

Association membership 
During the 1890s, there was an off-field power struggle within the VFA between the stronger and weaker clubs, as the stronger clubs sought greater administrative control commensurate with their relative financial contribution to the game. The League became recognised as the highest level of senior competition in the colony of Victoria, and the Association became the second-tier senior competition, a position it has maintained since.

The VFL gave those five clubs the opportunity to compete as a junior competition under and without representation on the VFL's administration, but they rejected the offer and continued as an independent body. One junior club, Brunswick, was elevated to senior status to bring the numbers to six. The Argus reported in March that two other junior clubs would be elevated to bring numbers to eight, with Essendon District, Brighton, Hawksburn, Hawthorn or Geelong all cited as potential candidates, but this did not eventuate and the association size remained at six teams until 1899.

The three Ballarat-based clubs – Ballarat, Ballarat Imperial and South Ballarat – had been members of the Association with representation on the Board of Management, but had not actively competed for the Association premiership. As there was no longer a strong administrative benefit to belonging to the weakened Association, those clubs also ended their affiliations prior to 1897.

A committee set up in 1896 prior to the secession, featuring delegates both from teams which did secede and teams which did not, developed a series of rule changes which were implemented in 1897: however, since the rules were not adopted until after the secession, the two bodies elected to adopt some slightly different rule changes. Key changes were:
 The modern system of scoring was introduced, with six points awarded for a goal and one point for a behind, replacing the system where games were decided solely on the number of goals scored. (Adopted by both bodies)
 The "little mark" was abolished, with the minimum length required for a kick to be claimed as a mark increased from two yards to ten yards (Adopted by both bodies)
 The number of players in a team was reduced from twenty to eighteen, with two follower positions eliminated. (Later adopted by the League in 1899)

Season results

Round 1

Round 2

Round 3

Round 4

Round 5

Round 6

Round 7

Round 8

Round 9

Round 10

Round 11

Round 12

Round 13

Round 14

Round 15

Round 16

Round 17

Round 18

Round 19

Round 20

Ladder

Notable events

Representative games 
The Association played one representative match during 1897, against the Ballarat Football Association at the Eastern Oval on 31 July.

Other notable events 
 Theodore Fink, MLA replaced Sir Frank Grey Smith as president of the Association. Smith had been president since 1887.
 Owing to work to upgrade the venue, the North Melbourne Recreation Reserve was not available during the season.  played most of its home games for the season at the East Melbourne Cricket Ground, sharing it with the League's Essendon Football Club; it also played one home game at Footscray when East Melbourne was unavailable.
 In Round 12, only nine of the Footscray team arrived for their match against Brunswick; Footscray was forced to call on trainers, reserves and about half a dozen willing spectators to take the field in order to field a full team. Despite this unusual handicap, Footscray still comfortably won the game.
 The Association introduced premiership medals to be award to players of the premier club for the first time, replacing the existing practice of awarding a premiership cap to each player.

See also 
 Victorian Football League (1897–1989)
 List of VFA premiers
 History of Australian rules football in Victoria (1853–1900)

References 

Victorian Football League seasons
VFL